Kaisa may refer to:

Kaisa (name), Finnish and Estonian feminine given name
Kaisa, Estonia, village in Saaremaa Parish, Saare County, Estonia
Kaisa (billiards), a cue sport mostly played in Finland
Kaisa Group Holdings Limited, a Chinese property development company, sponsors of Shenzhen F.C.
Kaisa, snow goose dæmon of Serafina Pekkala, a character in the His Dark Materials novel series by Philip Pullman
Kai'Sa, a character in the video game League of Legends and its associated virtual band K/DA

See also
Kaiser is the German title meaning "emperor", with Kaiserin being the female equivalent, "empress"